Roberta Valderrama (born October 5, 1977) is a Peruvian actress and improv performer.

Life and career 
She spent her childhood in Miami, Florida and Lima, Peru. She is best known for the role of Yolanda in 10 Items or Less, a partially improvised comedy series on TBS. Yolanda is "the power behind the produce counter and the mother of Carl's child." She first appeared on television in 2000, playing Stephanie, a candy striper who stalked Erik Palladino's character on a season 7 episode of ER. She holds a BFA from the Carnegie Mellon School of Drama and has also appeared in such stage productions as Three Sisters, ‘Tis a Pity She’s a Whore, The Merchant of Venice and Grownups on the Playground. In 2009, Valderrama starred in a Funny or Die video with Dennis Kenney titled "Happy Mother's Day!!!" In 2014, Valderrama appeared in The Purge: Anarchy as the villainous Lorraine.

Filmography

Film

Television

Web

Podcast

References

1977 births
American actresses
American people of Peruvian descent
Living people
Carnegie Mellon University College of Fine Arts alumni